Ano Pedina (before 1928: Άνω Σουδενά - Ano Soudena) is one of the villages in Central Zagori in the Ioannina regional unit, northwestern Greece. It is located on the western slopes of Mt Tymfi.

History 

The village is mentioned in a Golden Bulle of emperor Symeon Paleologos of Serbia from 1362. There are two monasteries, the monastery of Evangelistria and the monastery of Agia Paraskevi. The first is the oldest, restored in 1786, while the second was founded in 1750.

Notable people
Neophytos Doukas, humanist.

References 

Populated places in Ioannina (regional unit)
Zagori